is a 1970 Japanese drama film directed by Akira Kurosawa. The film stars Yoshitaka Zushi, Kin Sugai, Toshiyuki Tonomura, and Shinsuke Minami. It is based on Shūgorō Yamamoto's 1962 novel A City Without Seasons and is about a group of homeless people living in poverty on the outskirts of Tokyo.

Dodes'ka-den was Kurosawa's first film in five years, his first without actor Toshiro Mifune since Ikiru in 1952, and his first without composer Masaru Sato since Seven Samurai in 1954. Filming began on April 23, 1970, and ended 28 days later. This was Kurosawa's first-ever color film and had a budget of only . In order to finance the film, Kurosawa mortgaged his house, but it failed at the box office, grossing less than its budget, leaving him with large debts and, at sixty-one years old, dim employment prospects. Kurosawa's disappointment culminated one year later on December 22, 1971, when he attempted suicide by slashing his wrists and neck with a razor.

Plot
The film is an anthology of overlapping vignettes exploring the lives of a variety of characters who live in a suburban shantytown atop a rubbish dump. The first to be introduced is the boy Rokuchan, who lives in a fantasy world in which he is a trolley driver. In his fantasy world, he drives his tram along a set route and schedule through the dump, reciting the refrain "Dodeska-den", "clickety-clack", mimicking the sound of his vehicle. His dedication to the fantasy is fanatical. Rokuchan is called "trolley fool" (densha baka) by locals and by children who are outsiders. His mother is shown as being concerned that Rokuchan is genuinely mentally-challenged. (Rokuchan has earned the  label in several cinematographic writings.)

Ryotaro, a hairbrush maker by trade, is saddled with supporting many children whom his unfaithful wife Misao has conceived in different adulterous affairs, but is wholeheartedly devoted to them. There also appear a pair of drunken day laborers (Masuda and Kawaguchi) who engage in wife-swapping, only to return to their own wives the next day as though nothing has happened. A stoic, bleak man named Hei is frequented by Ocho who appears to be his ex-wife, and he watches emotionless as she takes care of his domestic chores. At the opposite end of the spectrum is Shima. Shima, a man with a tic, is always defending his outwardly unpleasant and bullying wife, and flies into a rage when friends criticize her. A beggar and his son live in a derelict car, a Citroen 2CV. While the father is preoccupied with daydreams of owning a magnificent home, the boy dies tragically of food poisoning. A girl (Katsuko) is raped by her alcoholic uncle and becomes pregnant, and in a fit of irrationality stabs a boy at the liquor shop who has tender feelings for her not having any other way to vent her emotional turmoil. When her uncle is confronted as a suspect for this abusive act, he decides to gather his meager belongings and flee from the town barely one step ahead of the investigation. Tanba the chasework silversmith is a sage figure, who disarms a youth swinging a katana sword, and allows a burglar to rob him of his money.

After exploring the set-backs and anguish which surrounds many of the families in this indigent community, along with the dreams of escape which many of them support to maintain at least a superficial level of calm, the film comes full circle returning to Rokuchan. As the film ends Rokuchan is again seen preparing to board his imaginary train tram and serve his community of passengers as best he can.

Cast

 Yoshitaka Zushi as Rokuchan
 Kin Sugai as Okuni, Rokuchan's mother
 Toshiyuki Tonomura as Taro
 Shinsuke Minami as Ryotaro Sawagami
 Yuko Kusunoki as Misao, Sawagami's wife
 Junzaburō Ban as Yukichi Shima
 Kiyoko Tange as Shima's wife
 Michio Hino as Ikawa, Shima's guest
 Keiji Furuyama as Matsui, Shima's guest
 Tappei Shimokawa as Nomoto, Shima's guest
 Kunie Tanaka as Hatsutaro Kawaguchi
 Jitsuko Yoshimura as Yoshie, Kawaguchi's wife
 Hisashi Igawa as Masuo Masuda
 Hideko Okiyama as Tatsu, Masuda's wife
 Hiroshi Akutagawa as Hei
 Tomoko Naraoka as Ocho
 Atsushi Watanabe as Tanba
 Kamatari Fujiwara as Suicidal Old Man

Production
Five years had elapsed since the release of Akira Kurosawa's last film, Red Beard (1965). The Japanese film industry was collapsing as the major studios were slashing their production schedules or shutting down entirely due to television stealing the movie audience. When Kurosawa was let go from the American film Tora! Tora! Tora! by Twentieth Century Fox in 1969, it was rumored that the Japanese director's mental health was deteriorating. Teruyo Nogami, Kurosawa's frequent script supervisor, believes the director needed to make a good film to put that rumor to rest. Dodes'ka-den was made possible by Kurosawa forming the Club of the Four Knights production company with three other Japanese directors; Keisuke Kinoshita, Masaki Kobayashi, and Kon Ichikawa. It was their first and only production.

It marks a stylistic departure from Kurosawa's previous works. It has no central story and no protagonist. Instead it weaves together the stories of a group of characters living in a slum as a series of anecdotes. It was his first color film, and he had only ever worked with a few of the actors previously; Kamatari Fujiwara, Atsushi Watanabe, Kunie Tanaka, and Yoshitaka Zushi. It marks the first time Kurosawa had used Takao Saito as principal cinematographer, and Saito became his "cinematographer of choice" for the rest of his career. Nogami said that Kurosawa told the crew that this time he wanted to make a film that is "sunny, light, and endearing." She speculated that Dodes'ka-den was his rebuttal to what went wrong on Tora! Tora! Tora!. The script supervisor of the film opined that the director was still recuperating from the shock of what happened on that Hollywood film, and was not operating at full strength. Nogami said that she gets choked up whenever she watches the scene where Rokuchan is called "trolley crazy" by children, because she imagines Kurosawa as the boy, with people yelling "Movie-crazy" at him. Kurosawa said that he wanted to show younger filmmakers that it did not need to cost a lot of money to make a movie. David A. Conrad wrote that an influence of the surging Japanese New Wave can be felt in this impulse and in the decision to focus on outcasts in contemporary society.

Filming
In contrast to Red Beard, which was in production for two years, filming for Dodes'ka-den began on April 23, 1970, and was finished in only 27 days, two months ahead of schedule. According to Stephen Prince, it was shot for standard-ratio 35 mm movie film rather than the anamorphic widescreen that Kurosawa had used since The Hidden Fortress (1958). Prince writes that this was because the director did not like how anamorphic lenses handled color information. As a result, it marks a return to the 1.33:1 aspect ratio he used regularly in the 1940s and early 1950s. Prince also states that Dodes'ka-den marks the first time the director used zoom lenses; a sign of the "speed and economy" with which he made the film. Nogami stated that she had never seen Kurosawa as "quiet and undemanding" on set as he was for Dodes'ka-den. As an example, she explained how during a nine-minute scene that had to be shot in one take, Junzaburō Ban had trouble memorizing all of his dialogue and caused numerous retakes. Nogami said "the old Kurosawa" would have lost his temper and started yelling, but instead he just gently said "let's try it again." and eventually praised Ban when the shot was finally completed. Nogami also related how Fujiwara was well-known for not being able to memorize his lines. While filming an eight-minute scene with Watanabe, Kurosawa finally had had enough and had Nogami give Fujiwara verbal prompts. Nogami said her voice was hard to remove from the final tape. The drawings that cover the walls of Rokuchan's house were initially drawn by Kurosawa at home. But he decided they were too "grown-up", and had schoolchildren draw them instead.

Title
The film's title "Dodeska-den" are the playacting "words" uttered by the boy character to mimic the sound of his imaginary trolley car in motion. In standard Japanese language, this sound would be described as gatan goton, equivalent to "clickity-clack" in English.

Reception
Dodes'ka-den was Kurosawa's first film in color. Domestically, it was both a commercial and critical failure upon its initial release. Abroad, however, the film gained an Academy Award nomination for Best Foreign Film in the 44th Academy Awards. Its Japanese reception, among other things, sent Kurosawa into a deep depression, and in 1971 he attempted suicide.

Despite continuing to draw mixed responses, Dodes'ka-den received votes from two artists – Sion Sono and the Dardenne brothers – in the British Film Institute's 2012 Sight & Sound polls of the world's greatest films.

Awards
The film won the Grand Prix of the Belgian Film Critics Association.

Documentary
A significant short 36-minute documentary was made by Toho Masterworks concerning this film by Kurosawa:

Akira Kurosawa: It Is Wonderful to Create (Toho Masterworks, 2002)

See also
 List of submissions to the 44th Academy Awards for Best Foreign Language Film
 List of Japanese submissions for the Academy Award for Best Foreign Language Film

Explanatory notes

References

Bibliography

External links
 
 Dodesukaden  at the Japanese Movie Database

1970 films
1970 drama films
Japanese drama films
1970s Japanese-language films
Japanese anthology films
Rail transport films
Films based on Japanese novels
Films directed by Akira Kurosawa
Films with screenplays by Shinobu Hashimoto
Films with screenplays by Akira Kurosawa
Films with screenplays by Hideo Oguni
Films scored by Toru Takemitsu
Toho films
Films about intellectual disability
Films about poverty
Films about homelessness
1970s Japanese films